Raman Mahadevan is an Indian playback singer, known for his Bollywood songs. He released an indipop album, Ramanasia, in 2007.

Career
Raman Mahadevan was born in Mumbai. After completing his studies at New Bombay High School and ICL college, Vashi, he worked for the IT and ITeS industry before taking up singing full-time. He learnt Carnatic music from guru Prasanna Warrier and later from Girija Shesu. He also learnt tabla from guru Palash Bordoloi. Apart from advertising jingles for Frito Lays, Pepsi, and Mirinda, he has also sung title song for "Aap Ki Kachehri" and also worked with dandiya groups. He has sung songs for Hindi movies like Heyy Babyy, Johnny Gaddaar and Taare Zameen Par. He has also released his own music album Ramanasia in 2007 and was featured in the song Tere Liye, composed by Saikat-Shankar, released in June 2009.

Personal life
Raman is not related to Shankar Mahadevan, with whom he performed at the cultural fest of NIT Calicut, Ragam 13 and in Yuva Dasara 2012 and 2014.

Filmography

Albums

AD/Jingles

References

https://web.archive.org/web/20101228133403/http://www.reverbnation.com/ramanmahadevan
http://www.myspace.com/ramanasia

http://ibnlive.in.com/news/the-next-big-thing-from-it-to-bollywood/61240-8.html 

http://findarticles.com/p/news-articles/dna-daily-news-analysis-mumbai/mi_8111/is_20100526/mahadevan-singer-music-composer/ai_n53799496/

Singers from Mumbai
Indian male playback singers
Bollywood playback singers
Living people
1978 births